The Ardmoreite is an American daily newspaper published Tuesday through Friday and Sunday mornings. The Ardmoreite is owned by Gannett.

The paper was owned by Stauffer Communications, which was acquired by Morris Communications in 1994. Morris sold the paper, along with thirteen others, to GateHouse Media in 2007.

References

External links

GateHouse Media
"The Daily Ardmoreite"  hosted by the Gateway to Oklahoma History.

Newspapers published in Oklahoma
Carter County, Oklahoma
Newspapers established in 1893
Gannett publications
1893 establishments in Oklahoma Territory